San Vito Chietino is a town and comune in the province of Chieti in the Abruzzo region of central Italy.

Geography
The town is bordered by Frisa, Lanciano, Ortona, Rocca San Giovanni, Treglio and Fossacesia.

Economy

The town is known for its trabocchi, large wooden platforms that were traditionally used for fishing on the southern coast of Abruzzo. Tourism has grown in recent decades.

Notable residents
Gabriele D'Annunzio, poet, lived in the town in 1900.
Stanislao Gastaldon (1861–1939), the composer of "Musica Proibita", spent his early childhood in San Vito Chietino.

References

External links 
 Official website

 

Cities and towns in Abruzzo
Coastal towns in Abruzzo